Nana Sandy Achampong is a Ghanaian media practitioner, novelist, poet and educator. He has worked in the fields of journalism, public relations, advertising, marketing, the visual arts and literature in Ghana, the United Kingdom and the United States. He is an author with books that cover the different genres of poetry, play, for children, fiction, non-fiction, Christian, media and anthology. He currently teaches at the African University College of Communications, where he is also the Director of the Ama Ata Aidoo Centre for Creative Writing.

Early life and education 
Achampong attended St. Hubert's Seminary School in Santasi, Kumasi. After completion and attaining his Advanced Level grade he then furthered his study by joining the Ghana Institute of Journalism, Accra. At the American InterContinental University he secured a Bachelor of Business Administration degree with a specialization in Project Management where he offered a Master's program in Education, specialization in Instructional Design and Technology.

Family 
Achampong was born in Cape Coast November 26, 1964, the third of seven siblings. His mother, Beatrice Faustina Forson, who died December 6, 2018 was the Principal of a midwifery school. His father Welbeck Kwame Acheampong, was a lawyer. He died in 1995. His mother then remarried to Mr. Joseph Amoah (who died in 2012), a publishing distributor for Caffrey Saunders, UK.

Published works 
Achampong is a proponent of contemporary writing and modern journalism. He has written on various topics and varying concepts, with some of his best work also encompassing the media and journalism. He scripted, produced and directed his first feature film 'The Ultimate Sacrifice' in the late 1990s and among his most famous works are 'Depressed', 'Embracing The Season', 'God Smiled', 'Sudan', 'Nature Sighed'.

Achampong's first book of verse, 'The Equilibrists', was published by Othello Books in 1995. His second volume of verse 'Floating' was published ten years later. He published the novel 'I Dream a Song' that was soon followed by 'Sun of God', a play in five acts. Among his most notable books is the 'Adinkra (ī'kŏn')-cepts: [concept ikons of the Asante Akan of West Africa],' which traces the history of the Akans of Ghana and explains some symbologies of their culture.

His second novel titled 'I, Immigrant' a controversial novel was published soon after. He encapsulates most of his poetical works in the '... and soft [salt]', a collection of some of the best of Nana Achampong's poetry works.

Career history 
Achampong has worked in various capacities and in various institutions, mostly media related across the world. In his earlier forays into the media Industry he worked at Smash-TV where he was appointed Director to create and produce three seasons of a seminal weekly entertainment magazine program for Ghana national and West African regional television.

In 1999 he worked as the Executive Producer and Director for Songhai Films UK Limited, London, United Kingdom during which time he directed his first feature film 'The Ultimate Sacrifice'.

He was also a Pioneer Editor of the Weekend Sun, a weekly 48-page tabloid. During which he oversaw the tabloid's website and media related content. In 2007, he worked at The Gene C. Bradford Hour as the Producer/Director where he scripted and co-hosted a Radio program on Radio One’s WOLB 1010 AM in Woodlawn, Maryland.

Achampong has worked in a capacity as Editor for ElderSpeak a weekly TV program on Fox's Good-TV. The Afro American Newspaper in Maryland, appointed him as their Special Correspondent in 2005 after his Masters.

References 

Ghanaian radio journalists
Ghanaian newspaper journalists
1964 births
Living people